An ice cream barge was a vessel employed by the United States Navy in the Pacific Theater of World War II to produce ice cream in large quantities to be provisioned to sailors and Marines. It was employed in the USN's Western Pacific area of operations, at one point anchored at Naval Base Ulithi. These ships were intended to raise the morale of U.S. troops overseas by producing ice cream at a fast rate.

See also
USS Quartz (IX-150), a contemporary of the ice cream barge, used as a "crockery" ship

References

Sources

Further reading

Concrete barges of the United States Navy
World War II naval ships of the United States
Barge